Mount Sergief is a stratovolcano located on the Aleutian island of Atka in the U.S. state of Alaska. Its highest point is 1,837 ft (560 m) above sea level.

Its last eruption was during the Pleistocene.

References 

Sergief
Sergief
Sergief
Pleistocene stratovolcanoes